Mikhail Temurovich Bgazhba  (1915 – 1993) was an Abkhaz Communist leader who served as the First Secretary of the Communist Party of Abkhazia from February 1958 until September 1965.

References

1915 births
1993 deaths
Abkhazian politicians
Communist Party of the Soviet Union members
Place of birth missing
Soviet politicians